Liga ASOBAL 1998–99 season was the ninth since its establishment. A total of 14 teams competed this season for the championship.

Competition format
This season, the competition format consisted in two phases.

Overall standing

Championship playoff

permanence playoff

In–Out playoff

Bidasoa remained in Liga ASOBAL.

Top goal scorers

1998
handball
handball
Spain